Tracheloptychus petersi, commonly known as Peters's keeled cordylid, is a species of lizard in the family Gerrhosauridae.
The species is found in Madagascar.

References

Tracheloptychus
Reptiles described in 1869
Reptiles of Madagascar
Taxa named by Alfred Grandidier
Endemic fauna of Madagascar